Lampung United Football Club (simply known as LUFC or Lampung United) is an Indonesian football club based in Bandar Lampung, Lampung. They currently compete in the Liga 3 and their homeground is Sumpah Pemuda Stadium.

References

External links

Bandar Lampung
Football clubs in Indonesia
Football clubs in Lampung
Association football clubs established in 2019
2019 establishments in Indonesia